Clendenin is a town in Kanawha County, West Virginia, United States, situated along the Elk River. The population was 850 at the 2020 census.

History
In the 1800s, Clendenin was a small settlement at the confluence of Big Sandy Creek and the Elk River that eventually became a small village named Chilton. At this time, timber and coal mining were the principal industries in the area. In 1846, one of the first cannel coal veins was discovered at Falling Rock (only a few miles from Chilton/Clendenin) and became a rich source for manufacturing artificial gas. Clendenin was platted in 1877.

In 1893, the Coal and Coke railroad was built running through Clendenin, paralleling the Elk River and allowing the logging industry to set up residence. Along with the drilling of the first gas well in the area in 1900, this allowed the development of one of the largest oil and gas fields in West Virginia. The town was incorporated in 1904 and named after the Clendenin family, an early pioneer family in the Kanawha River Valley. The first petrochemical plant in the world was built in Clendenin in 1920. This plant was the original Union Carbide Corporation facility. Other chief economic staples included timber, coal, gas, oil, and salt. The decades from 1900 to 1930 saw most of the towns growth, and construction of most of the major buildings in town, including the elementary, middle, and high schools, several large churches, three banks, and several blocks of commercial buildings. When Union Carbide moved their production plant from Falling Rock to Charleston, the economy slowed but Clendenin remained a commercial hub for northern Kanawha County, southern Roane County, and western Clay County until Interstate 79 bypassed the town in the 1980s.

Clendenin suffered damage during the 2016 West Virginia flood. Recovery was largely complete by January 2020, although some homes remained in need of demolition or rebuilding.

The current mayor of Clendenin is Kay Summers.  Town elections (including the office of mayor and city council) occur every two years. Recent efforts have been made by 25045-A New Clendenin (a non-profit corporation based in Clendenin) and the Business and Industrial Development Corporation (headquartered in Charleston) to enhance economic and cultural development in the town.

Geography

Climate
The climate in this area is characterized by hot, humid summers and generally mild to cool winters.  According to the Köppen Climate Classification system, Clendenin has a humid subtropical climate, abbreviated "Cfa" on climate maps. In Clendenin, 236 days out of the year have fog, and 153 days have precipitation.

Sites of interest

First petrochemical plant
A spinoff of the oil and gas industries started at Clendenin in 1920 when Union Carbide built the world's first petrochemical plant—producing synthetic chemicals from natural gas. Carbide soon relocated to South Charleston, and the Kanawha Valley became the nation's chemical capital. But the oil and gas boom had already put Clendenin on the map, with a thriving downtown section.

November 1966 Mothman sighting
On November 12, 1966, a small group of gravediggers were digging a plot inside Clendenin's Reamer Hill Cemetery for a resident named Homer Smith who had recently died. The group was led by Kenneth Duncan, Smith's son in law. Duncan later claimed that while digging, he observed a large brown winged man take flight from a nearby tree and glide overhead for approximately one minute before flying off. 

Four days later, two young couples from Point Pleasant, Roger and Linda Scarberry and Steve and Mary Mallette, told police they saw a large gray creature whose eyes "glowed red" when the car headlights picked it up. They described it as a "large flying man with ten-foot wings", following their car while they were driving in the McClintic Wildlife Management Area outside of town, known locally as the "TNT area", the site of a former World War II munitions plant. The creature soon became known as the "Mothman" and this sighting compelled Duncan to come forward with his account, which he and the others had kept quiet about for four days.

This Clendenin incident is widely believed to be one of the first reported sightings of the Mothman, although authors Loren Coleman and John Keel have documented possible earlier sightings within their respective works.

Other sites of interest
Other sites of interest include:
 Clendenin Historic District
 Roxy Theater
 Elk River
 Morris Creek Wildlife Management Area
 Elk Refinery
 Original Clendenin High School Building
 The Hedges Mansion

Demographics

The median income for a household in the town was $32,000, and the median income for a family was $38,021. Males had a median income of $30,000 versus $18,500 for females. The per capita income for the town was $16,587. About 9.7% of families and 14.6% of the population were below the poverty line, including 13.7% of those under age 18 and 20.2% of those age 65 or over.

2010 census
As of the 2010 census, there were 1,227 people, 524 households, and 335 families residing in the town. The racial makeup of the town was 98.7% White, 0.2% African American, 0.3% Asian, and 0.7% from two or more races. Hispanic or Latino of any race were 0.1% of the population.

There were 524 households, of which 27.1% had children under the age of 18 living with them, 49.0% were married couples living together, 10.7% had a female householder with no husband present, 4.2% had a male householder with no wife present, and 36.1% were non-families. 31.7% of all households were made up of individuals, and 15.3% had someone living alone who was 65 years of age or older. The average household size was 2.34 and the average family size was 2.96.

The median age in the town was 43.5 years. 21.7% of residents were under the age of 18; 6.8% were between the ages of 18 and 24; 23.8% were from 25 to 44; 29% were from 45 to 64; and 18.7% were 65 years of age or older. The gender makeup of the town was 49.8% male and 50.2% female.

Education
Kindergarten through 12th grade students in Clendenin attend Clendenin Elementary School (PK-5), Elkview Middle School (6-8), and Herbert Hoover High School (West Virginia) (9-12). Only the Clendenin Elementary lies within the boundaries of the city. Elkview Middle School is located 7 miles from Clendenin in neighboring Elkview, WV and Herbert Hoover High School is located just outside the city boundaries and has a Clendenin mailing address.

As of the 2010-2011 academic year and in terms of WESTEST 2 math and RLA scores, Clendenin Elementary was ranked 152nd out of 407 primary schools in the state (up 192 ranks from the prior year, and 10th most-improved in the state), receiving an average 48.5 in math and 49.8 in RLA. There were 350 students enrolling in 2010 with a student-teacher ratio of 15.2 students per teacher.

Elkview Middle was ranked 62nd of 159 middle schools in the state (up 28 ranks from the prior year, and 24th most-improved in the state), receiving an average 42.2 in math and 52.8 in RLA. Enrollment at the school in 2010 was 681 students and the student-teacher ratio was 16.2.

Herbert Hoover High was ranked 41st of 118 high schools in the state (up 64 ranks from the prior year, and the most-improved high school in the state), receiving an average 40.8 in math and 49.3 in RLA. Enrollment at the school in 2010 was 797 students and the student-teacher ratio was 16.2.

Vocational schools in the area include Everest Institute, Garnet Career Center, Kanawha Valley Community and Technical College, and West Virginia Junior College.

Post-secondary four year and graduate education facilities near Clendenin are primarily located in and around the Charleston, WV urban area, which is located 21 miles away from the town. These schools include West Virginia State University, the University of Charleston, and West Virginia University Institute of Technology (a subsidiary campus of West Virginia University). Both Marshall University and West Virginia University have graduate college facilities located within the Charleston, WV urban area.

Notable people
Bill Karr, played right end for the Chicago Bears from 1933 to 1938, scoring 18 TDs on a career total of only 48 receptions
Billy Joe Mantooth, 1970 All American at Ferrum College; transferred to West Virginia University in 1971, played in the NFL for the Philadelphia Eagles and Houston Oilers
Dave Stephenson, played in the NFL for the Los Angeles Rams and Green Bay Packers

References

External links

Towns in Kanawha County, West Virginia
Towns in West Virginia
Charleston, West Virginia metropolitan area